All data about demographic information regarding Western Sahara are extremely error-prone, regardless of source.  Most countries take censuses every ten years, and some every five in order to stay abreast of change and miscounts; the last count was conducted in 1970, and even that data by colonial Spain is considered unreliable due to large nomadic populations.

Following the 1975 Green March, the Moroccan state has sponsored settlement schemes enticing thousands of Moroccans to move into the Moroccan-occupied part of Western Sahara (80% of the territory). By 2015, it was estimated that Moroccan settlers made up at least two thirds of the 500,000 inhabitants. Under international law, Morocco's transfer of its own civilians into Non-Self-Governing territory is in direct violation of Article 49 of the Fourth Geneva Convention (cf. Israeli and Turkish settlers).

The religion in Western Sahara is Sunni Islam. The major ethnic groups  are Arab and Berbers. The most common language is Arabic.

CIA World Factbook demographic statistics
The following demographic statistics are from the CIA World Factbook, unless otherwise indicated.

Languages
Modern Standard Arabic and Spanish, the former colonial language, are the official languages of the Polisario Front, based in Tindouf, Algeria. Hassaniya, an Arabic dialect, is the native language spoken in Western Sahara and in the refugee camps in Tindouf in Algeria. There is also a significant presence of Berber language speakers in the northern parts of the territory of Western Sahara.

Hassaniya, primarily spoken at home, is dominated by the Moroccan dialect spoken in the streets, workplace, and schools. This is because the great majority of the population consists of Moroccans who settled in Western Sahara. French is also commonly used by the Moroccan administration. In the urban areas Moroccan Arabic is now spoken, as Morocco controls and administers most of the territory of Western Sahara and all of its cities, and considers it an inseparable part of the country. The Moroccan constitution stipulates two official languages for the Kingdom of Morocco, including Western Sahara: Berber (Tamazight) and Arabic.

Spanish is common among Sahrawi people and especially among the Sahrawi diaspora, with the Sahrawi Press Service, official news service of the Sahrawi Arab Democratic Republic, being available in Spanish since 2001 and the Sahara Film Festival, Western Sahara's only film festival, showing mainly Spanish-language films. Spanish is used to document Sahrawi poetry and oral traditions and has also been used in Sahrawi literature. Despite Spanish having been used by the Sahrawi people for over a century, the Cervantes Institute does not provide support or Spanish-language education to Sahrawis in Western Sahara and the Sahrawi refugee camps in Algeria. A group of Sahrawi poets known as 'Generación de la Amistad saharaui' produces Sahrawi literature in Spanish.

Religions

Sunni Islam is the major religion in Western Sahara. Sunni Muslims constitute about 99.9% of the population. Prior to 1975 there were over 20,000 Roman Catholics in Western Sahara but  there were only around 100.

Nationality

Noun:
Western Saharan(s)
adjective:
Western Saharan

Population
400,000 (November 2014  est.)

Age structure
0–14 years:
44.9% (male 92,418/female 89,570)
15–64 years:
53.8% (male 105,191/female 108,803)
65 years and over:
2.3% (male 3,881/female 5,337) (2010 est.)

Population growth rate
3.097% (2011 est.)

Birth rate
39.54 births/1,000 population (2010 est.)

Death rate
11.49 deaths/1,000 population (2010 est.)

Net migration rate
−6.05 migrant(s)/1,000 population (2000 est.)

Morocco has a policy of subsidizing Moroccan settlers in the territory.

Infant mortality rate
69.66 deaths/1,000 live births (2010 est.)

Life expectancy at birth
total population:
54.32 years
male:
52 years
female:
56.73 years (2010 est.)

Total fertility rate
4.3 children born/woman (2011 est.)

Literacy
definition:
NA
total population:
NA%
male:
NA%
female:
NA%

Refugees

The events triggered by the Moroccan and Mauritanian joint invasion of Western Sahara at the end of 1975 are directly linked to the large displacement of the Saharawi population, most of whom live as refugees in south-west Algeria. The major bulk of Saharawis became refugees during the war between the Polisario Front and Morocco. The south-western desert region near Tindouf offered a potential safe region. Algeria, in its rivalry with Morocco, offered the Sahrawis a safe place to settle and actively supported the Polisario.

The next Saharawi exodus, although on a smaller scale, took place in 1979 when Mauritania withdrew from the conflict and Morocco annexed the rest of Western Sahara. Exact figures cannot be provided for the numbers that fled the territory in those two waves, but the estimations are between 1/3 and 2/3 of the total population at that time. The current size of the population in the refugee camps is believed to be around 165,000.

Used by the Algerian government, this figure is the most widely quoted by NGOs and is also used by the UNHCR and the World Food Programme to raise funds for food aid to the refugees. In the 2004 WFP meeting in Rome, the number of refugees was officially recognized at 158,000.

See also
Legal status of Western Sahara
Demographics of Morocco

References